Hunnebostrand is a locality situated in Sotenäs Municipality, Västra Götaland County, Sweden with 1,731 inhabitants in 2010.

References 

Populated places in Västra Götaland County
Populated places in Sotenäs Municipality